The XXVIII World Rhythmic Gymnastics Championships were held in Patras, Greece, September 19–23, 2007, at the National Sports Centre.

Medal winners 

* reserve gymnast

Individual

Team

Qualification

Other competitors
  Anahi Sosa
  Ashken Mamulyan
  Lalit Tonoyah
  Naazmi Johnston
  Kimberly Mason
  Zeynab Javadli
  Maria Yushkevich
  Angelica Kvieczynski
  Ana Paula Ribeiro
  Ana Paula Scheffer
  Yuca Solano
  Stela Sultanova
  Stefanie Carew
  Alexandra Martincek
  Valentina Merino
  Catalina Ulloa
  Yidan Ding
  Hongyang Li
  Yuting Liang
  Wania Monteiro
  Katia Oliviera
  Raisa Panagiotou
  Roza Maria Pantzi
  Loukia Trikomiti
  Iva Mendlikova
  Monika Mickova
  Nela Radimerska
  Loreto Achaerandio
  Nuria Artiguez
  Carolina Rodriguez
  Jana Lukjanova
  Julia Huuhtanen
  Maria Ringinen
  Marleena Saresvirta
  Delphine Ledoux
  Francesca Jones
  Tatia Donadze
  Ketevan Khatiashvili
  Lisa Ingildeeva
  Daria Stolbin
  Evmorfia Dona
  Evangelia Gkountroumpi
  Viktoria Soos
  Dora Vass
  Ilana Brener
  Daniel Falah
  Julieta Cantaluppi
  Romina Laurito
  Beatrice Zancanaro
  Mai Hidaka
  Yukari Murata
  Yuria Onuki
  Ai Yokochi
  Marina Petrakova
  Maiya Zainullina
  Avahan Bazakova
  Violetta Ivanova
  Lee Kyung-hwa
  Sin Un-jin
  Yana Isakova
  Marina Kisluhina
  Yelena Meyerzone
  Natalia Ziveca
  Seow Ting Foong
  Jaime Yoke Jeng Lee
  Wen Chean Lim
  Rut Castillo
  Veronica Navarro Blizzard
  Sofia Sanchez Velasco
  Cynthia Valdes Perez
  Marta Koczkowska
  Anna Zdun
  Sara Caetano
  Catarina Geraldes
  Ines Gomes
  Mariana Romao
  Sibongile Mjekula
  Odette Richard
  Stephanie Sandler
  Mojca Rode
  Tjasa Seme
  Snezana Paunic
  Petra Macalova
  Michaela Micikova
  Katarina Vargova
  Therese Larsson
  Natnaree Chimplee
  Waraporn Pornsirijanya
  Sridee Tharatip
  Kuang-Tzu Ku Kou
  Ying-Tzu Lai
  Pei-Yi Wu
  Pei-Lung Yu
  Ezgi Solmaz
  Berfin Serdil Sutcu
  Rachel Marmer
  Lisa Wang
  Julie Zetlin
  Zarina Mukhitdinova
  Djamila Rahmatova

All-Around

Rope

Hoop

Clubs

Ribbon

Groups

Group compositions
  Valentina Baldauf
  Catherine Czak
  Selina Poestinger
  Katharina Reitgruber
  Lisa Stampfl
  Natascha Strobel
  Anna Bitieva
  Vafa Huseynova
  Anastasia Makarova
  Anastasia Prasolova
  Alina Tryopina
  Valeria Yegay
  Alesia Babushkina
  Vera Davidovich
  Dzina Haitiukevich
  Hlafira Martsinovich
  Kseniya Sankovich
  Alina Tumilovich
  Daniela Leite
  Tayanne Mantovaneli
  Luisa Marumi Matsuo
  Marcela Menezes
  Nicole Muller
  Natalia Sanchez
  Tzveta Kousseva
  Yolita Manolova
  Zornitsa Marinova
  Maya Paunovska
  Ioanna Tantcheva
  Tatyana Tongova
  Kathryn De Cata
  Alissa Hansen
  Monika Lechowicz
  Suzanne Lendvay
  Brihana Mosienko
  Roxanne Porter
  Maria Ignacia Aguilera
  Andrea Cargioli
  Stephanie Belen Estrada
  Natalia Isabel Olavarría
  Maria Ignacia Palma
  Karina Susana Torres
  Tao Chou
  Yuan-Yang Lu
  Jian-Shuang Sui
  Dan Sun
  Shuo Zhang
  Dan Zhu
  Yanet Comas
  Maydelis Delgado
  Rachel Kindelan
  Elsy Zenaide Ortiz
  Yeney Renovales
  Mirlay Sanchez
  Barbara Gonzalez
  Lara Gonzalez
  Isabel Pagan
  Ana Maria Pelaz
  Veronica Ruiz
  Elisabeth Salom
  Helena Bogdan
  Carita Gronhoelm
  Nina Hanhela
  Sirja Kokkonen
  Rina Maatta
  Vanessa Martins Lopes
  Nathalie Fauquette
  Julie Gournay
  Clara Huet
  Aurélie Lacour
  Ketty Martel
  Jessica Pantieri
  Doreen Gepert
  Samantha Kazmierczak
  Olga Lukjanow
  Anja Naujoks
  Olena Novichkova
  Annika Rejek
  Ioanna Diamantidou
  Dimitra Kafalidou
  Dimitra Koutropoulou
  Olga-Afroditi Piliaki
  Paraskevi Plexida
  Nikoleta Tsagari
  Alena Dvornichenko
  Katerina Pisetsky
  Maria Savenkov
  Rahel Vigdorchick
  Veronika Vitenberg
  Elisa Blanchi
  Fabrizia D'Ottavio
  Marinella Falca
  Daniela Masseroni
  Elisa Santoni
  Anzhelika Savrayuk
  Chihana Hara
  Saori Inagaki
  Nachi Misawa
  Eri Takayasu
  Kotono Tanaka
  Honami Tsuboi
  Diana Alzhanova
  Valeriya Prokudina
  Ravilya Ravikova
  Svetlana Sedenkova
  Dariya Simonova
  Anastassiya Voronova
  Yun Hee Gim
  Sung-Eun Hong
  Soo Hyun Jeong
  Min-Jee Kang
  Hye Jin Kim
  Ju Hyun Kwak
  Blajaith Aguilar
  Sofia Diaz de Leon
  Marlenne Martinez
  Ana Cristina Ortega
  Citlaly Quinta
  Catherine De Vos
  Sophie Hallwright
  Katie Pearce
  Kate Ronaldson
  Germaine Tang
  Leilani Van Dieren
  Inga Buczynska
  Martyna Dabkowska
  Anna Gorna
  Malgorzata Lawrynowicz
  Maria Podsiedlik
  Alexandra Wojcik
  Margarita Aliychuk
  Anna Gavrilenko
  Tatiana Gorbunova
  Elena Posevina
  Daria Shkurikhina
  Natalia Zueva
  Chantal Breitinger
  Celestine Donze
  Sarah Marchini
  Sarah Simmen
  Lisa Tacchelli
  Tiziana Vonlanthen
  Olena Dmytrash
  Polina Kondaurova
  Alina Maksimenko
  Viera Perederiy
  Oksana Petulko
  Vita Zubchenko
  Kristian Brooks
  Stephanie Flaksman
  Krista Johnson
  Nicole Kowalik
  Marina Ljuvoja
  Michelle Wojtach
  Katherin Arias Olive
  Mariangel Balza Reveron
  Catherine Cortez Egla
  Andrea Myerston Crespo
  Maria Gabriela Trompetero Vicent

All-Around

5 Ropes Final

3 Hoops + 2 Clubs Final

Medal table

External links
Official site
FIG Official results https://database.fig-gymnastics.com/public/results/display/14877?idAgeCategory=8&idCategory=78

2007
2007 in gymnastics
International gymnastics competitions hosted by Greece
Sports competitions in Patras
2007 in Greek sport